South Carolina Highway 742 (SC 742) is a  primary state highway in the U.S. state of South Carolina. It connects Chesterfield with Wadesboro, North Carolina.

Route description
SC 742 is a two-lane rural highway that traverses from SC 145, near Chesterfield, to the North Carolina state line. The road continues into North Carolina as North Carolina Highway 742 (NC 742) towards Wadesboro.

History

It was established in 1942 as a renumbering of SC 850 and to match NC 742, little has changed since. SC 850 was  established in 1940 as a new primary routing from SC 85 to the North Carolina state line.

Major intersections

See also

References

External links

SC 742 at Virginia Highways' South Carolina Highways Annex

742
Transportation in Chesterfield County, South Carolina